Pseudozelota is a genus of longhorn beetles of the subfamily Lamiinae, containing the following species:

subgenus Hefferniella
 Pseudozelota mima (Breuning, 1938)
 Pseudozelota punctipennis (Schwarzer, 1930)

subgenus Pseudozelota
 Pseudozelota capito (Pascoe, 1865)

References

Mesosini